Permanent Me was an American pop punk band from Bellmore, New York.

History
Permanent Me first formed while its members were in high school, first as "The Madison Chase", then "Crown Victorian", and then thirdly as "Yes, Virginia". The group benefited from online promotion on sites such as MySpace, and after catching the ear of Sum 41 lead singer Deryck Whibley and producer Matt Squire, Yes, Virginia signed to independent label I Surrender Records. The group changed its name to Permanent Me after legal issues with a band with the same name from NYC. They then recorded their first EP, Dear Virginia, which came out in May 2006. Later in 2006 the group signed to Island Records subsidiary Stolen Transmission and released their first full-length, After the Room Clears, early in 2007. After the release of their CD bassist Justin Morrell announced he was leaving Permanent Me and later joined the band Big City Lights. Justin was replaced with Mike's cousin Arthur. In November 2007 it was announced that Mike and Arthur were leaving Permanent Me. In January 2008 Permanent Me released a new demo on their Myspace, and were writing a new record. Permanent Me decided in March 2008 to disband go their separate ways.

Mike is now drumming for Nightmare of You.

Arthur now plays bass for SKYES, Ryan Star, The Hate My Day Jobs, The The The Thunder and other artists in the NYC area.

Members
Former members
Brian James - vocals, guitar
Joseph Guccione - guitar, vocals (Permanent Me); drums, bass (The Madison Chase)
Adam Aviles - guitar (The Madison Chase)
Jon Bulzomi - bass (The Madison Chase/Crown Victorian/Yes, Virginia)
Chris Leonard - guitar (The Madison Chase/Crown Victorian)
Arthur Fleischmann - bass ( SKYES / Permanent Me / The Hate My Day Jobs / The The The Thunder / Ryan Star)
Mike Fleischmann - drums (The Madison Chase/Crown Victorian/Yes, Virginia/Permanent Me)
Justin Morrell - bass (Permanent Me)
Dan McCabe - guitar (Yes, Virginia)

Discography
Dear Virginia EP (I Surrender Records, 2006)
After the Room Clears (Stolen Transmission, 2007) US Billboard Heatseekers No. 44

References

External links
Permanent Me on Myspace

SKYES
Ryan Star
The Hate My Day Jobs

Musical groups from Long Island
Pop punk groups from New York (state)